Country Code: +679; International Call Prefix: 00 or 052; National Significant Numbers (NSN): seven-digits; Format: +679 yyy xxxx

Number allocations in Fiji

Fiji has no area codes and no leading trunk "0". The first digit of the number indicates usage or location.

All telephone numbers are seven digits long. Mobile telephones are also seven digits long and begin with a 7,9,8 or 2.

The international access code is 00 or 052 depending on whom it is routed through: 00 is through FINTEL and 052 through Telecom Fiji.

See also 
 Telecommunications in Fiji

References

Communications in Fiji
Telephone numbers by country